Ningzhou may refer to:

18843 Ningzhou, a main-belt asteroid discovered in 1999
Ningzhou Town, a town in Huaning County, Yuxi, Yunnan, China
Ningzhou (historical prefecture), a former prefecture in modern Gansu, China between the 6th and 20th centuries